Yohana Oscar Mkomola (born 18 April 2000) is a Tanzanian professional football forward.

Club career
He was born in the Tanzanian city of Songea. At a young age he went abroad, signing a contract with the Tunisian football club Étoile Sportive du Sahel. He spent one season in this team. On the eve of the start of the 2017/18 season, he returned to his homeland, where he became a player of the club Young Africans. In 2018, he played two matches for Young Africans in the CAF Confederations Cup. In the 2018/19 season, together with the team, he became a runner-up of the Tanzanian Premier League.

In September 2019 he signed contract with the Ukrainian Premier League club Vorskla. He played for this club in the Ukrainian Premier League Reserves.

In 2020, he was sent on loan to Inhulets Petrove.

International career
He made his debut for the Tanzania national football team on 9 December 2017 in the lost (2:1) match of a Group A of the CECAFA Cup against the Rwanda. Mkomola came on the pitch at the 75th minute of game, replacing Yahya Zayd. He played 2 matches in this tournament.

External links

References

2000 births
Living people
Tanzanian footballers
Tanzanian expatriate footballers
Tanzania international footballers
People from Ruvuma Region
Association football midfielders
Étoile Sportive du Sahel players
FC Vorskla Poltava players
Young Africans S.C. players
FC Inhulets Petrove players
Expatriate footballers in Tunisia
Expatriate footballers in Ukraine
Tanzanian expatriate sportspeople in Tunisia
Tanzanian expatriate sportspeople in Ukraine
Ukrainian Premier League players
Ukrainian First League players
Tanzania youth international footballers
Tanzanian Premier League players